NGC 283 is a spiral galaxy in the constellation Cetus. It was discovered on October 2, 1886 by Francis Leavenworth.

References

External links
 

0283
18861002
Cetus (constellation)
Spiral galaxies
Discoveries by Francis Leavenworth
-02-03-031
3124